Special Central American Assistance Act of 1979 was a United States federal statute established by the 96th United States Congress amending the Foreign Assistance Act of 1961 for purposes of cultivating civility, democratization, and non-interventionism in Central America. The Act of Congress endorsed the Organization of American States embodied by Costa Rica, El Salvador, Guatemala, Honduras, Nicaragua, and Panama with an affirmation denouncing left-wing terrorism, subversive political ideology, and third world socialism.

The United States statute's articulation was a consistent Act affirming the Carter Administration's foreign policy with a prominent emphasis regarding international human rights during the Cold War or New Cold War era. The H.R. 6081 bill was enacted into law on May 31, 1980, by the 39th President of the United States Jimmy Carter.

Declaration of the Act
The 96th congressional session penned the United States public law 96-257 as three sections citing the amendment and purpose of the Act with section five hundred and thirty-six conveyed as eleven subsections entitled Central American Economic Support.

Special Central American Assistance Act of 1979 - 94 Stat. 422 § I

Foreign Assistance Act of 1961 Amendment - 94 Stat. 422 § II

Central American Economic Support - 94 Stat. 422-424 § DXXXVI
(b) Appropriation authorization
(c) Human rights violations
◇ Human rights in Costa Rica
◇ Human rights in El Salvador
◇ Human rights in Guatemala
◇ Human rights in Honduras
◇ Human rights in Nicaragua
◇ Panama Truth Commission
(d) Presidential encouragement of human rights
(e) Nicaragua acknowledgment or adherence of internationally recognized Universal Declaration of Human Rights
(f) Report to congressional committees
(g) Certification of nonterrorism; Transmittal to the Speaker of the House and the Senate Committee on Foreign Relations
(h) U.S. support of Organization of American States members against terrorism
(i) Funds available for National Agrarian University of Nicaragua and National Autonomous University of Nicaragua
(j) Loan funds for private sector use and local currency loan programs
(k) Assistance conditions and termination
◇ Free and open elections
◇ Loan funds and United States goods or services purchase
◇ United States President reports to Congress

Human Rights Practices and United States International Relations

The Foreign Assistance Act of 1974 described the terms of gross violations of internationally recognized human rights as defined;

 Torture or cruel and unusual punishment, inhuman or degrading treatment, or punishment
 Prolonged detention without charges
 Flagrant denial of the right to life, liberty, and the security of person

The International Security Assistance and Arms Exports Control Act of 1976 acknowledge the international obligations of human rights as endorsed by Title III - General Limitations of the Act passed by the 94th United States Congress. The section amended the Foreign Assistance Act of 1961 declaring United States human rights objectives as defined;

 Foreign policy of the United States is to foster increased observance of internationally recognized human rights by all countries
☆ Security assistance nullified for any country where the government engages in a consistent pattern of gross violations of internationally recognized human rights
 Coordinator for Human Rights and Humanitarian Affairs establish within United States Department of State
☆ Continuous  observation  and  review  of human  rights and humanitarian affairs with an inclusion concerning coordination of United States foreign policy
 Prohibition against discrimination
☆ Respect for human rights and fundamental freedoms without distinction of language, race, religion, or sex 
 Prohibition of assistance to countries granting sanctuary to international terrorists
☆ Assistance terminated to any government granting sanctuary from prosecution whereas an act has been committed regarding a gross violation of internationally recognized human rights or international terrorism

The International Development and Food Assistance Act of 1977 mandated annual reports better known as Country Reports on Human Rights Practices. The Bureau of Democracy, Human Rights, and Labor published the human rights reports providing insight concerning global humanitarian affairs for countries receiving United States economic security and national security support as authorized by the Foreign Assistance Act of 1961.

Associated United States Federal Statutes
United States public laws relative to the Special Central American Assistance Act of 1979 subsequently under the auspices of the International Security and Development Cooperation Act.

See also

Depictions of the Latin American Revolution during Cold War
 Films depicting Latin American military dictatorships

References

Historical Video Archive

Further reading

External links
 
 
 
 
 
 
 
 
 
 
 
 

1980 in American law
96th United States Congress
Presidency of Jimmy Carter
United States foreign relations legislation